Serov railway station is a railway station in Serov, Sverdlovsk Oblast, Russia. Severny Ural connecting Moscow and Priobye stops at this station.

trains

References 

Railway stations in Sverdlovsk Oblast